Swe Fly was an independent airline based in Nyköping, Sweden. All flights were suspended on September 2, 2005 due to financial problems.

History

The airline was established in 1994 as WestEastAir and renamed to Svea Flyg in 1999. It later acquired a Boeing 767-200 for long-haul services. Due to financial difficulties, the company ceased flying in September 2005, only months after it began service to the United Kingdom and Pakistan.

Destinations

Swe Fly operated the following services as of 2005:

Domestic scheduled destinations: Kalmar, Stockholm, Ronneby and Växjö.
International scheduled destinations: Amsterdam, Copenhagen, Lahore, Leeds, London Luton, Oslo.

Fleet

The Swe Fly fleet consisted of the following aircraft in October 2005:

 1 - Boeing 767-200 
 5 - Fokker 50

External links
Swe Fly
Swe Fly Boeing Fleet Detail

Defunct airlines of Sweden
Airlines established in 1994
Airlines disestablished in 2005
1994 establishments in Sweden